Peter Till (born 19 August 1963) is an English former boxer. He was 5 ft 6 in and fought in the lightweight category. He was born in Walsall West Midlands.

Career
Born in Walsall, West Midlands, Till's career spanned from 1985 to 1996 and saw him participate in 52 fights.

Personal life
His son Peter, Jr. is a footballer.

References

1963 births
Living people
Sportspeople from Walsall
English male boxers
Lightweight boxers